The 1946–47 season was the first season in FK Partizan's existence. This article shows player statistics and matches that the club played during the 1946–47 season.

Players

Squad information
(league matches/league goals)

Stjepan Bobek (23/24)Miroslav Brozović (23/2)Béla Pálfi (21/4)Zlatko Čajkovski (20/3)Kiril Simonovski (19/5)Franjo Rupnik (18/11)Prvoslav Mihajlović (18/9)Aleksandar Atanacković (17/3)Milivoje Đurđević (17/0)Franjo Glazer (16/0) (goalkeeper)Stanislav Popesku (13/0)Miodrag Jovanović (13/0)Silvester Šereš (12/2)Florijan Matekalo (7/3)Jane Janevski (6/1)Risto Nikolić (6/0) (goalkeeper)Vladimir Firm (4/3)Momčilo Radunović (4/0)Ratko Čolić (2/0)Stevan Jakuš (2/0)Franjo Šoštarić (2/0) (goalkeeper)Šepe Šutevski (1/0)

Friendlies

Friendly matches in 1945–46.

Competitions

Yugoslav First League

Matches

See also
 List of FK Partizan seasons

References

External links
 Official website
 Partizanopedia 1946-47

FK Partizan seasons
Partizan
Yugoslav football championship-winning seasons